The 2006 World Junior Table Tennis Championships were held in Cairo, Egypt from 10 to 17 December 2006. It was organised by the Egyptian Table Tennis Federation under the auspices and authority of the International Table Tennis Federation (ITTF). The fourth edition of the tournaments consisted of mixed doubles competitions and singles, doubles and team competitions for both boys and girls.

Medal summary

Medal table

See also
2006 World Team Table Tennis Championships

References

Table Tennis Championships
2006
Table tennis competitions in Egypt
International sports competitions hosted by Egypt
Table tennis in Africa
2006 in Egyptian sport
World Junior Table Tennis Championships